Plas Power (WMR) railway station was a station in Southsea, Wrexham, Wales. The station was opened in February 1883, closed to passengers on 1 January 1931 and closed completely on 2 April 1956.

References

Further reading

Disused railway stations in Wrexham County Borough
Railway stations in Great Britain opened in 1883
Railway stations in Great Britain closed in 1931
Former Great Western Railway stations